Kanbawza Football Club is a Burmese football club, based in Taunggyi, Myanmar. Their home stadium name is KBZ Stadium in Shan State.

Sponsorship

Club

Coaching staff
{|class="wikitable"
|-
!Position
!Staff
|-
|Manager|| Soe Myat Min
|-
|rowspan="4"|Assistant Manager|| U Thein Tun Thein
|-
| U Than Like
|-
| U Aung Tun Tun
|-
| U Hum Tun
|-
|Goalkeeper Coach||
|-
|Fitness Coach||
|-

Other information

|-

First team squad

Transfers

In:

Out:

References

External links
 Kanbawza FC in Burmese
 First Eleven Journal in Burmese
 Soccer Myanmar in Burmese

Kanbawza